The Emperor's Club is a 2002 American drama film directed by Michael Hoffman and starring Kevin Kline. Based on Ethan Canin's 1994 short story "The Palace Thief", the film follows a prep school teacher and his students at a fictional East Coast boys' prep school, St. Benedict's Academy.

Plot
In the early 1970s, William Hundert is a revered classics teacher at a boarding school at Saint Benedict's, a boys' boarding school for the scions of wealthy families. Hundert attempts to impart wisdom and a sense of honor to his students. He begins the new school year by making student Martin Blythe read a plaque that hangs over his door containing a statement by an ancient Mesopotamian ruler, Shutruk Nahunte. The plaque sings Shutruk Nahunte's praises, but Hundert explains that he contributed nothing of value to his kingdom, and as a result is virtually forgotten today.

Hundert's disciplined life and classroom are shaken when a new student, Sedgewick Bell, is enrolled in the middle of the term. Sedgewick, the underachieving, spoiled son of a U.S. senator, frequently disrupts class and does poorly in his homework. Hundert meets with Sedgewick's father Hiram to talk about his behavior, only to discover that Hiram has minimal interest in Sedgewick's education beyond the passing of his classes.

Hundert decides to help Sedgewick, and as they develop a friendship, Sedgewick's grades show improvement. Sedgewick works very hard to earn a spot in the school's annual "Mr. Julius Caesar contest", in which the top three students compete in a classics quiz in front of the entire school. However, Sedgewick only qualifies in fourth place. Hundert, not wanting his efforts with Sedgewick to be all for naught, raises his grade to qualify, which effectively excludes Martin, the rightful third-place contestant. During the competition, Hundert spies Sedgewick using crib notes, but the headmaster orders Hundert to ignore it, as Sedgewick's father is a major donor for the school. Hundert then deliberately asks Sedgewick a question on Hamilcar Barca which was not covered in class; it is answered correctly by another contestant, Deepak Mehta, who is crowned "Mr. Julius Caesar". The cheating is never made public, but the trust Sedgewick and Hundert had in each other is broken. Sedgewick returns to his old ways and barely graduates, with Hundert expressing deep disappointment that he failed Sedgewick.

Twenty-five years later, Hundert is poised to become the new headmaster, but resigns in shock when a less experienced colleague gets the position due to his fundraising ability. Hundert is later told that Sedgewick, now a wealthy corporate CEO, will make a large donation to Saint Benedict's, contingent upon Hundert hosting a Mr. Julius Caesar rematch at Sedgewick's resort hotel on the Gold Coast, Long Island. The other members of Sedgewick's graduating class are also invited, and all enjoy the reunion. The three original contestants begin the competition, but as it progresses, Hundert realizes that Sedgewick is once again cheating by being fed answers through an earpiece. Hundert asks a question about Shutruk Nahunte, which all the students find laughably easy; however, Sedgewick is unable to answer it. Deepak answers correctly and once again wins. Afterward, Sedgewick formally announces that he is running for a seat in the U.S. Senate. While the men applaud, Hundert is appalled that he was used for political grandstanding.

After the announcement, Hundert and Sedgewick run into each other in the men's room, leading to a confrontation between the two. Sedgewick tells Hundert that in the real world, dishonesty trumps principles, and that Hundert has let life pass him by. Sedgewick's words are overheard by his young son, who is shocked to learn the truth about his father. That evening at the hotel bar, Hundert apologizes to Martin and admits that he gave his spot to Sedgewick in the competition years ago. Martin tentatively forgives him. The following morning, the resort is apparently empty; however, Hundert is then greeted by a surprise party held in his honor by his former students, who present to him an award engraved with a quote about education. The men wave goodbye to Hundert as he departs in a helicopter, and he reflects that while he failed with Sedgewick, he succeeded with other students.

Hundert returns to his old job teaching classics in the present-day Saint Benedict's, which is now coeducational and more diverse. His class includes Martin's son, Martin Blythe IV. Hundert peers outside the window to see the older Blythe gladly waving to his old teacher. Hundert has the younger Blythe read the plaque above the door.

Cast

Production

Development 
The film, originally titled The Palace Thief, was first developed at Fine Line Features, with Kevin Kline reportedly in talks to star and direct. The production went into turnaround and was acquired by Universal Pictures. Michael Hoffman, who had previously collaborated with Kline on Soapdish and A Midsummer Night's Dream, was announced to direct.

Filming 
Principal photography took place in New York City from May to June of 2001. The school campus scenes were filmed at the Emma Willard School in Troy, New York.

Reception
On review aggregator Rotten Tomatoes, The Emperor's Club holds a 50% approval rating based on 128 reviews with an average rating on 5.80/10. The website's critics consensus reads: "Though Kline is excellent in his portrayal of Hundert, the movie is too dull and sentimental to distinguish itself from other titles in its genre." On Metacritic, the film had an average score of 49 out of 100, based on 32 reviews, indicating "mixed or average reviews".

The performances of Kline and Hirsch were lauded, with some saying the former "manages a mix of quiet joy and melancholic disillusionment within the confines of a very reserved role", and others noting the latter plays Sedgewick with "a intuitive brew of cunning, charm and malice". Roger Ebert gave the film three stars and praised the complexity of Hundert's flawed character, noting that as "a portrait of the escalator that speeds the sons of the rich upward toward power, it is unusually realistic". However, multiple critics pointed out the film is weakened by its sentimentality and muddled messaging. The Chicago Tribunes Michael Wilmington said the film "boasts lots of talent" and has the potential to explore "some unusual themes" about ethics and values, but ultimately gives in to plot contrivances and improbabilities. 

David Stratton of At the Movies opined, "It's decently made, decently acted and moderately interesting but, in the end, pretty forgettable. When it finally gets to the point, which is a potentially interesting one about the duplicity of some sections of the Establishment, interest has waned." Many also opined the film hews too closely to the clichés of the "inspirational teacher" film genre.

A.O. Scott of The New York Times said, "The younger actors, especially Mr. Dano and Jesse Eisenberg, as a bright, skittish boy named Masoudi, have the right mix of anxiety and bravado, but the St. Benedict's boys are as thinly conceived as the minor adult characters." He added Hundert "is less a person than a walking moral problem and is in fact more interesting as an ethical puzzle than as a psychological study". Robert Koehler of Variety noted that in the film's third act, the casting of the older students "doesn’t jibe physically with their younger selves."

Others lamented the changes from the original short story. Writing for The Washington Post, Stephen Hunter commented, "Where complexity within the characters is suggested, it's quickly milled out in the generic spirit of sentimentality about the school experience. Where the original ending may have been bittersweet and full of self-recrimination, this ending is triumphant and self-congratulatory. You walk out yearning for the rebellious, grungy untidiness of real kids".

Accolades 
At the 24th Young Artist Awards in 2003, the film received nominations for Best Family Feature Film – Drama, and for Best Performance in a Feature Film – Supporting Young Actor for Emile Hirsch.

See also 
 Goodbye, Mr. Chips (1934), a novella by James Hilton about a classics teacher at a British boarding school, exploring his legacy and the lives he touched
 "The Changing of the Guard", a June 1, 1962, episode of The Twilight Zone starring Donald Pleasence as a retiring English teacher at a New England boys' school, who questions whether or not he has made any difference in his students' lives
 Dead Poets Society (1989), a similar drama film set in a boys' preparatory school, about a teacher influencing a class of young men
 Mona Lisa Smile (2003), a similar drama film set in a girls' college, about a teacher influencing a class of young women
 In the House (2012), another film about a complicated instructor–student relationship

References

External links

 
 
 

2002 films
2002 comedy-drama films
American comedy-drama films
American buddy drama films
Films directed by Michael Hoffman
Films about educators
Films about the upper class
Films based on short fiction
Films set in boarding schools
Class reunions in popular culture
Films set in New York (state)
Films shot in New York (state)
Films set in the 1970s
Films set in the 2000s
2000s buddy drama films
Universal Pictures films
Films scored by James Newton Howard
Films produced by Marc Abraham
Sidney Kimmel Entertainment films
Beacon Pictures films
Films about teacher–student relationships
2000s English-language films
2000s American films